FC Basel 1893 Superleague Formula team was a motor racing team representing Switzerland's FC Basel in the Superleague Formula championship.

They finished 15th in the inaugural championship with young German driver Max Wissel. It returned in 2009 with Wissel behind the wheel once again, finishing 3rd in the standings. He finished 3rd again in 2010. The team did not return for the 2011 season.

Record
(key)

2008

2009
Super Final results in 2009 did not count for points towards the main championship.

2010

References

External links
 FC Basel 1893 Superleague Formula team minisite
 Official FC Basel 1893 football club website

FC Basel
Superleague Formula club teams
2008 establishments in Switzerland